A gastric chief cell (or peptic cell, or gastric zymogenic cell) is a type of gastric gland cell that releases pepsinogen and gastric lipase. It is the cell responsible for secretion of chymosin in ruminant animals. The cell stains basophilic upon H&E staining due to the large proportion of rough endoplasmic reticulum in its cytoplasm. Gastric chief cells are generally located deep in the mucosal layer of the stomach lining, in the fundus and body of the stomach.pathologyoutlines.com/topic/stomachnormalhistology.html

Chief cells release the zymogen (enzyme precursor) pepsinogen when stimulated by a variety of factors including cholinergic activity from the vagus nerve and acidic condition in the stomach. Gastrin and secretin may also act as secretagogues.

It works in conjunction with the parietal cell, which releases gastric acid, converting the pepsinogen into pepsin.

Nomenclature
The terms chief cell and zymogenic cell are often used without the word "gastric" to name this type of cell. However, those terms can also be used to describe other cell types (for example, parathyroid chief cells). Chief cells are also known as peptic cells.

See also 

 Gastric acid
 Fundic glands
List of human cell types derived from the germ layers

References

External links
 
  - "Ultrastructure of the Cell: chief cells and enteroendocrine cell"
  - "Digestive System: Alimentary Canal: fundic stomach, gastric glands, base"
  
 

Peptide hormone secreting cells
Human cells
Chief cell